Toshiba is a yacht. She finished seventh in the 1997–98 Whitbread Round the World Race skippered by Dennis Conner and Paul Standbridge.

Career
Toshiba was designed by Bruce Farr and built by New England Boat Works.

References

Volvo Ocean Race yachts
Sailing yachts of the United States
Volvo Ocean 60 yachts
1990s sailing yachts